The Prioninae are a subfamily of Cerambycidae (long-horned beetles). They are typically large (25–70 mm) and usually brown or black. The males of a few genera sport large mandibles that are used in fights with other males, similar to stag beetles. These beetles are commonly nocturnal and are attracted to light. The majority of the Prioninae whose biology is known are borers whose larvae feed on rotting wood or roots.

Genera
The following genera are recognised in the subfamily Prioninae:

 Acalodegma
 Acanthinodera
 Acanthophorus
 Acideres
 Aegolipton
 Aegosoma
 Aerogrammus
 Aesa
 Afraustraloderes
 Agrianome
 Allaiocerus
 Allomallodon
 Anacolus
 Analophus
 Ancistrotus
 Andinotrichoderes
 Anoeme
 Anomophysis
 Anomotoma
 Anoplotoma
 Anthracocentrus
 Aplagiognathus
 Apocaulus
 Apterocaulus
 Arba
 Archetypus
 Archodontes
 Archotoma
 Atrocolus
 Aulacopus
 Aulacotoma
 Bandar
 Baralipton
 Basitoxus
 Bifidoprionus
 Biribellus
 Bouyerus
 Bracheocentrus
 Braderochus
 Brephilydia
 Cacodacnus
 Cacosceles
 Callergates
 Callipogon
 Callistoprionus
 Calloctenus
 Calocomus
 Cantharocnemis
 Cantharoctenus
 Casiphia
 Catypnes
 Ceratocentrus
 Chalcoprionus
 Chalybophysis
 Chariea
 Charmallaspis
 Chiasmetes
 Chondrothus
 Chorenta
 Clesotrus
 Closterus
 Cnemoplites
 Crossocnemis
 Cryptipus
 Cryptobelus
 Ctenoscelis
 Cubaecola
 Curitiba
 Cyanolipton
 Cycloprionus
 Dandamis
 Delocheilus
 Derancistrachroma
 Derancistrus
 Derelophis
 Derobrachus
 Dinoprionus
 Diseoblax
 Dorysthenes
 Droserotoma
 Drumontiana
 Dysiatus
 Eboraphyllus
 Elaptoides
 Elaptus
 Elateropsis
 Emphiesmenus
 Enneaphyllus
 Enoplocerus
 Eotithoes
 Episacus
 Ergates
 Erioderus
 Erythraenus
 Esmeralda
 Ethioeme
 Eudianodes
 Eurynassa
 Eurypoda
 Flabellomorphus
 Galileoana
 Geoffmonteithia
 Glyphosoma
 Gnathonyx
 Guedesia
 Hagrides
 Hastertia
 Hephialtes
 Hermerius
 Hileolaspis
 Hisarai
 Holonotus
 Homoeomyzo
 Hoplideres
 Hoplidosterus
 Hovatoma
 Hovorelus
 Hovorodon
 Howea
 Hyleoza
 Hystatoderes
 Hystatus
 Ialyssus
 Insuetaspis
 Jamwonus
 Komiyasoma
 Lachneophysis
 Lasiogaster
 Leiophysis
 Leiotoma
 Leontiprionus
 Lobarthron
 Logaeus
 Lulua 
 Lundgrenosis
 Macrodontia
 Macrophysis
 Macroprionus
 Macrotoma
 Mallaspis
 Mallodon
 Mallodonhoplus
 Mallodonopsis
 Mecosarthron
 Megobaralipton
 Megopis
 Meroscelisus
 Mesoprionus
 Metaegosoma
 Microarthron
 Microphysis
 Microplophorus
 Miniprionus
 Monocladum
 Monodesmus
 Motilon
 Myzomorphus
 Nannoprionus
 Nataloma
 Navosoma
 Navosomopsis
 Neoma
 Neomallodon
 Neosarmydus
 Nepiodes
 Nesopriona
 Nicias
 Nocalusa
 Nothopleurus
 Notophysis
 Oceanomegopis
 Ochroptera
 Oideterus
 Olethrius
 Ommatomenus
 Omotagus
 Opisognathus
 Oropyrodes
 Orthomegas
 Orthosoma
 Osphryon
 Otheostethus
 Palaeomegopis
 Parachorenta
 Paradandamis
 Paramacrotoma
 Parastrongylaspis
 Parelaptus
 Parapsilotarsus
 Paroplites
 Phaolus
 Phlyctenosis
 Physopleurus
 Piesacus
 Pingblax
 Pixodarus
 Platygnathus
 Plumiprionus
 Poecilopyrodes
 Poekilosoma
 Pogonarthron
 Polyarthron
 Polylobarthron
 Polyoza
 Ponchelibius
 Praemallaspis
 Prionacalus
 Prionapterus
 Prinobius
 Prionoblemma
 Prionomma
 Prionoplus
 Prionotoma
 Prionus
 Priotyrannus
 Prosternodes
 Protorma
 Psalidocoptus
 Psalidognathus
 Psalidosphryon
 Psephactus
 Pseudoplites
 Pseudoprionus
 Psilotarsus
 Pyrodes
 Quercivir
 Remphan 
 Rhachicolus
 Rhaesus
 Rhaphipodus
 Rhineimegopis
 Rhipidocerus
 Rhodocharis
 Rodriguezius
 Rugosophysis
 Samolethrius
 Sarifer
 Sarmydus
 Sarothrogastra
 Scatopyrodes
 Sceleocantha
 Schizodontus
 Seabria
 Seticeros
 Sobarus
 Solenoptera
 Sphenostethus
 Spiloprionus
 Spinimegopis
 Stenodontes
 Stictosomus
 Stolidodere
 Strongylaspis
 Tagalog 
 Talupes
 Teispes
 Tereticus
 Tersec
 Titanus
 Tithoes
 Toxeutes
 Tragosoma
 Trichocnemis
 Trichoderes
 Trichophysis
 Trichoprionus
 Tropidoprion
 Typoma
 Ucai
 Ulogastra
 Unilaprionus
 Utra 
 Vandewegheia
 Vietetropis
 Xanthonicias
 Xaurus
 Xixuthrus
 Ziglipton
 Zooblax

References

External links
 
 
 
 Bugguide.net page on Prioninae
 Prioninae typ
Jeniš I. (2008) The Prionids of the World, Jeniš I. (2010) The Prionids of the Neotropical region

 
Woodboring beetles